The San Benito Saints were a minor league baseball team based in San Benito, Texas. In 1931, San Benito played as members of the Class D level Rio Grande Valley League, finishing in last place in their only season of minor league play. The Saints hosted home games at the San Benito Base Ball Park.

History
Prior to the minor league San Benito "Saints," a semi–professional team of the same name played for many seasons in San Benito.

In 1931, the Class D level Rio Grande Valley League formed. The league began the season with the Corpus Christi Seahawks, Harlingen Ladds and McAllen Palms joining the San Benito Saints in playing as charter members. The league began play on April 22, 1931. On June 4, 1931, the Corpus Christi Seagulls moved to La Feria to become the La Feria Nighthawks.

The Rio Grande Valley League folded during the season. On July 30 the league folded, with the Saints finishing last in the final standings. The Saints finished the season in 4th place overall. San Benito ended the 1931 overall regular season with a record of 40–55, playing the season under managers Bishop Clements and Elgar Waitman. McAllen finished 7.5 games ahead of the 2nd place Seahawks/Nighthawks in the final overall standings, with San Benito 16.5 games behind McAllen. The league did hold finals, where McAllen swept La Feria.

For hitting home runs, San Benito players received a free barbershop visit.

Following the 1931 season, the Rig Grande Valley League folded. San Benito, Texas has not hosted another minor league team.

The ballpark
The 1931 San Benito Saints hosted home minor league games at the San Benito Ball Park. The ballpark was located at North Fannin & West Heywood Street, next to the Hondo River.

Year–by–year records

Notable alumni
No San Benito alumni advanced to the major leagues.

On June 10, 1931 the Saints signed 3B "Cotton" Williams, C Dutch Hoffman and 2B Eddie Williford to the roster.

References

External links
Baseball Reference

Defunct minor league baseball teams
Professional baseball teams in Texas
Defunct baseball teams in Texas
Baseball teams established in 1931
Baseball teams disestablished in 1931
1931 establishments in Texas
1931 disestablishments in Texas
Defunct Rio Grande Valley League teams
Cameron County, Texas
Sports in the Rio Grande Valley